Deshabandu Robosingho Arachchilage Don Sugath Thilakaratne (born July 30, 1973 in Norton Bridge, Sri Lanka), commonly as Sugath Thilakaratne, is a Sri Lankan athlete who competed in the 400 metres.

His best season was in 1998, when he improved his personal best by almost a second to 44.61 and subsequently won medals in three international championships. His best performance in a major global competition was in the 2001 World Championships where he reached the semi final.

Sugath is currently the President of the Sri Lanka Athletic Association. He was appointed to the post on 14 May 2015.

Achievements

References

External links
 

1973 births
Living people
People from Central Province, Sri Lanka
Sri Lankan male sprinters
Athletes (track and field) at the 1994 Commonwealth Games
Athletes (track and field) at the 1998 Commonwealth Games
Athletes (track and field) at the 2002 Commonwealth Games
Athletes (track and field) at the 1996 Summer Olympics
Athletes (track and field) at the 2000 Summer Olympics
Olympic athletes of Sri Lanka
Asian Games medalists in athletics (track and field)
Athletes (track and field) at the 1998 Asian Games
Athletes (track and field) at the 2002 Asian Games
Commonwealth Games medallists in athletics
Asian Games gold medalists for Sri Lanka
Asian Games bronze medalists for Sri Lanka
Commonwealth Games bronze medallists for Sri Lanka
Medalists at the 1998 Asian Games
Medalists at the 2002 Asian Games
Medallists at the 1998 Commonwealth Games